Crosskeya is a genus of flies in the family Tachinidae.

Species
C. assimilis Shima & Chao, 1988
C. chrysos Shima & Chao, 1988
C. gigas Shima & Chao, 1988
C. longicornis Shima & Chao, 1988
C. nigrotibialis Shima & Chao, 1988
C. papuana Shima & Chao, 1988

References

Diptera of Asia
Exoristinae
Tachinidae genera